Ulysses Flores Ferreras is a Filipino botanist (plant taxonomist), working as Research Associate at Philippine Native Plants Conservation Society

Life

Other Projects

Publications by Ferreras

Ferreras, U.F., . 2012. "The Plants of El Nido, Palawan"
Thomas E Marler. & Ferreras. 2014. Differential leaflet mortality may influence biogeochemical cycling following tropical cyclones.
Commun Integr Biol.
 Raab Bustamante, Maximilian Kindler & U. Ferreras (2015) Die Orchidee (Hamburg) 66: 370.
Bulbophyllum translucidum Kindler, R.Bustam. & Ferreras, Orchidee (Hamburg) 2(4)E: 4, figs. 1-7 (2016).
Bulbophyllum vespertilio Ferreras & Cootes, OrchideenJ. 17(4): 150 (149-151; figs.) (2010).
Diplycosia bartolomei Ferreras & Argent, Edinburgh J. Bot. 68(1): 39 (-42; fig. 1) (2011).
Dischidia bulacanensis Kloppenb., G.Mend. & Ferreras, Hoya New 2(1): 20 (2014).
Eupatorium leonardii Ferreras & E.E.Lamont, Brittonia 64(4): 369 (2012).
Euphlebium rhodochilum Ferreras & Cootes, OrchideenJ. 17(2): 54 (-57; figs.) (2010).
Hoya acanthominima Kloppenb., G.Mend. & Ferreras, Hoya New 1(1): 22 (2013).
Hoya amrita Kloppenb., Siar & Ferreras, Asklepios 110: 27 (-29; figs.) (2011).
Hoya apoensis subsp. sagittaria Kloppenb., Siar & Ferreras, Hoya New 1(2): 3 (2013).
Hoya apoensis var. sagittarius Kloppenb., Siar & Ferreras, Fraterna 23(4): 5 (-8; figs.) (2010), nom. inval.
Hoya bandongii Kloppenb. & Ferreras, Fraterna 24(4): 9 (-12; figs.) (2011). 
Hoya carmelae Kloppenb., Siar & Ferreras, Fraterna 23(4): 9 (-13; figs.) (2010). 
Hoya chiekoae Kloppenb., Ferreras & G.Mend., Hoya New 1(4): 17 (2013).
Hoya corazoniae Kloppenb., Siar & Ferreras, Fraterna 23(4): 15 (-19; figs.) (2010).
Hoya coriacea subsp. philippinensis Kloppenb., Siar & Ferreras, Hoya New 1(4): 44 (2013).
Hoya cupula Kloppenb., G.Mend. & Ferreras, Hoya New 1(1): 15 (2013).POWO 
Hoya heuschkeliana subsp. marionii Kloppenb. & Ferreras, Hoya New 2(1): 26 (2014).
Hoya irisiae Ferreras, Kloppenb. & Tandang, Hoya New 2(2): 3 (2014).POWO 
Hoya isabelaensis Kloppenb., Siar & Ferreras, Fraterna 24(4): 24 (-28; figs.) (2011).
Hoya kanlaonensis Kloppenb., Siar & Ferreras, Fraterna 23(4): 24 (-27; figs.) (2010).

References

Living people
20th-century Filipino botanists
Year of birth missing (living people)